Ivy Quainoo (born 25 August 1992) is a German singer. In February 2012, she won the first series of The Voice of Germany. In December 2017, it was announced that she would be one of six competing entrants in Unser Lied für Lissabon, the German national final for Eurovision Song Contest 2018.

Early life 
Ivy Quainoo was born in Berlin-Neukölln to Ghanaian parents. She attended the Schiller High School in Charlottenburg. While still in school and also after her Abitur in 2011, she attended a dramatic arts school in Kreuzberg. In the summer of 2011, Ivy was featured as a background singer in writer/singer Jakob Royal's self-titled debut album.

After finishing high school, she auditioned for the reality talent show The Voice of Germany. During the live broadcasts, Quainoo was the only participant of the series to be voted in every time by the spectators. During the finals show on February 10, 2012, she received 33.65% of the combined votes, based on telephone voting and the number of song downloads, with which she left the other three final candidates behind.

Career

2012: Ivy 

After the final show, she promoted her single "Do You Like What You See?" on the Harald Schmidt Show and on Verstehen Sie Spaß?. Her first album, entitled Ivy, was released in March 2012. At the Echo award ceremony she sang, together with Aura Dione, Caro Emerald, Ina Müller and Dionne Bromfield, the song "Valerie" in memory of Amy Winehouse. Furthermore, Quainoo presented her second single "You Got Me" on ProSieben Celebrity Boxing. On 14 May 2012, she started her first tour of Germany with a concert in Lüneburg. On the final show of Germany's Next Topmodel Quainoo sang her single "Break Away". In October 2012, Quainoo worked with Mousse T. on a song for the movie Man tut was Mann kann. She also recorded the Song "Who You Are" with Stanfour for the mini-series World Without End. On November 16, she released her album Ivy as a Gold Edition in which these new songs are available.

2013–present: Wildfires & film debut
Quainoo has been working on her second studio album in New York City, London & Los Angeles. In June, Quainoo stated that the album is finished and will be published in fall 2013. The album called Wildfires which was revealed some days later. On 6 September 2013, the first single "Wildfires (Light it Up)" from her second studio album was released.   
To promote the single and the album Wildfires, Quainoo performed at Schlag den Raab, Promi Big Brother and also having several radio interviews round the release dates.
The album Wildfires was released on 27 September 2013.
In October Quainoo is a special guest on Olly Murs Germany tour dates. Her next solo tour started in January 2014 and was called Wildfires Live Tour.

In 2015, Ivy Quainoo announced that she was focusing on an acting career by making her small film debut in the upcoming sequel Captain America: Civil War.

Other ventures 
Ivy Quainoo filmed commercial spots for VW in 2012. Since February 2013 she is the ambassador of the German campaign Together for Africa. In June 2013, Quainoo walked as a model for the Berlin Fashion Week.

Discography

Albums

Singles

Awards and nominations

Tours

Headlining
2012: Ivy Quainoo Tour
2014: Wildfires Live Tour

Opening act
2013: Right Place Right Time Tour

References

External links 
 Ivy Quainoo at the-voice-of-Germany.de

1992 births
Living people
Musicians from Berlin
The Voice (franchise) winners
Winner01
German people of Ghanaian descent
Quainoo, Ivy
21st-century German women singers